Cupressus arizonica var. glabra, known as the Arizona smooth bark cypress or smooth Arizona cypress, is a conifer native to the American Southwest, with a range stretching over the canyons and slopes in a somewhat wide vicinity around Sedona, Arizona. It was first described by George Bishop Sudworth in 1910.

It is distinguished from Cupressus arizonica var. arizonica by its very smooth, non-furrowed bark which can appear in shades of pink, cherry, and grey.

It is often seen in cultivation, as unlike the Monterey cypress, it has proved almost immune to cypress canker.

References 
Wolf, C. B. & Wagener, W. E. (1948). The New World cypresses. El Aliso 1: 195–205.

External links 
 
 Cupressus.net: Cupressus glabra
 Gymnosperm database.org: Cupressus glabra

arizonica var. glabra
Flora of Arizona
Endemic flora of the United States
Trees of the Southwestern United States
Plants described in 1910